Helicia blakei, also named Blake's silky oak, is a species of rainforest tree, of northeastern Queensland, Australia, from the flowering plant family Proteaceae.

Botanists know of them growing naturally only (endemic) from a few collections in the rainforests of the Wet Tropics region, from about  altitude.

References

blakei
Proteales of Australia
Flora of Queensland